The 2022 AFC Champions League qualifying play-offs was played from 8 to 15 March 2022. A total of 16 teams competed in the qualifying play-offs to decide seven of the 40 places in the group stage of the 2022 AFC Champions League.

Teams
The following 14 teams, split into two regions (West Region and East Region), entered the qualifying play-offs, consisting of two rounds:
2 teams entered in the preliminary round.
12 teams entered in the play-off round.

Format

In the qualifying play-offs, each tie was played as a single match. Extra time and penalty shoot-out were used to decide the winner if necessary.

Schedule
The schedule of each round was as follows.

Bracket

The bracket of the qualifying play-offs for each region was determined based on each team's association ranking and their seeding within their association, with the team from the higher-ranked association hosting the match. Teams from the same association could not be placed into the same tie. The seven winners of the play-off round (three from West Region and four from East Region) advanced to the group stage to join the 33 direct entrants.

Play-off West 1
 Al-Taawoun advanced to Group D.

Play-off West 2
 Nasaf Qarshi advanced to Group E.

Play-off West 3

 Sharjah advanced to Group A.

Play-off East 1
 Sydney FC advanced to Group H.

Play-off East 2
 Vissel Kobe advanced to Group J.

Play-off East 3
 Ulsan Hyundai advanced to Group I.

Play-off East 4
 Daegu FC advanced to Group F.

Preliminary round

Summary

A total of two teams played in the preliminary round.

|+East Region

|}

East Region

Play-off round

Summary
A total of 14 teams played in the play-off round: 12 teams which entered in this round, and two winners of the preliminary round.

|+West Region

|}

|+East Region

|}

West Region

East Region

Notes

References

External links

2022 AFC Champions League
March 2022 sports events in Asia